Sociedade Esportiva União Cacoalense, commonly referred to as União Cacoalense, is a Brazilian football club based in Cacoal, Rondônia. The club competes in the Campeonato Rondoniense Série A, the top division in the Rondônia state football league system.

They have won the Campeonato Rondoniense twice.

History
The club was founded on 1 January 1982. União Cacoalense won the Campeonato Rondoniense in 2003 and in 2004.

Achievements
Campeonato Rondoniense: 2
2003, 2004

Stadium
Sociedade Esportiva União Cacoalense play their home games at Estádio Aglair Tonelli Nogueira. The stadium has a maximum capacity of 5,000 people.

References

Football clubs in Rondônia
Association football clubs established in 1982
1982 establishments in Brazil